Herod Agrippa (Roman name Marcus Julius Agrippa; born around 11–10 BC –  in Caesarea), also known as Herod II or Agrippa I, was a grandson of Herod the Great and last Jewish King of Judea from AD 41 to 44. He was the father of Herod Agrippa II, the last king from the Herodian dynasty. He spent his childhood and youth at the imperial court in Ancient Rome where he befriended the imperial princes Claudius and Drusus, the son of Tiberius. He suffered a period of disgrace following the death of Drusus which forced him to return to live in Judea. Back in Rome around 35, Tiberius made him the guardian of his grandson Tiberius Gemellus and Agrippa approached the other designated heir, Caligula. The advent of the latter to the throne allowed him to become king of Batanea, Trachonitis, Gaulanitis, Auranitis, Paneas and Chalcis in 37 by obtaining the old tetrarchies of Philip and Lysanias, then Galilee and Perea in 40, following the disgrace of his uncle, Herod Antipas.

After the assassination of Caligula, he played a leading role in Rome in the accession of Claudius to the head of the empire in 41 and he was endowed with the former territories of Archelaus – Idumea, Judea and Samaria – thus ruling over a territory as vast as the ancient kingdom of Herod the Great.

Carrying a dual Jewish and Roman identity, he played the role of intercessor on behalf of the Jews with the Roman authorities and, on the domestic level, gave hope to some of his Jewish subjects of the restoration of an independent kingdom. Pursuing the Herodian policy of euergetism through major works in several Greek cities of the Near East, he nevertheless alienated some of his Greek and Syrian subjects while his regional ambitions earned him the opposition of the imperial legate of the Roman province of Syria, Marsus. He died suddenly—possibly poisoned—in 44.

He is the king named Herod whose death is recounted in the Acts of the Apostles .

Biography

Origins

Family
Agrippa is the son of Aristobulus IV, one of the children that Herod the Great, king of Judea had with Mariamne the Hasmonean. His mother is Berenice, daughter of Salome, daughter of Antipater and sister of Herod the Great, who is close to Antonia Minor, daughter of Marcus Antonius and Octavia, sister of Auguste. Herod the Great is therefore both the paternal grandfather and the maternal great-uncle of Agrippa, who was born around 11 or 10 BC. J.-C., probably in Judea. His parents mark the Roman status of this Jewish prince by giving him the name of a close collaborator of the Emperor Augustus, Marcus Vipsanius Agrippa.

Herod the Great was a sovereign considered a cruel usurper by his subjects but devoted to the Roman imperial cause which he greatly favored in his kingdom. His reign is marked by numerous family intrigues - he had ten wives - and bloody. Thus, in 29 BC. J.-C., the king executes his wife Mariamne by jealousy, grandmother of Agrippa and, the following year, the mother of this one. In 7 BC, when Agrippa was only three years or four old, Herod had his father and his uncle Alexander executed following palace intrigues which also led to the execution, three years later, of Antipater — a son he had with Doris — as well as that of Costobarus, Agrippa's maternal grandfather. Herod also caused the disappearance of a large number of members of the Hasmonean dynasty and its supporters, which found itself almost annihilated. The king however spares the children of Aristobulus, the boys Agrippa, Herod and Aristobulus Minor as well as the girls Herodias and Mariamne.

Agrippa thus descends from both the Hasmonean and Herodian dynasties, but his father's death sentence for treason seems to set him aside from a logic of succession.

Imperial court
thumb|Bust of Drusus, 
In 5 BC, two years after the condemnation of his father, the young Agrippa was sent by Herod the Great to the imperial court of Rome in the company of his mother Berenice as well as his brothers and sisters. He is supported there by his mother's friend, Antonia Minor, sister-in-law of Tiberius - who will become emperor in 14 - and mother of the future emperor Claudius, as well as by Empress Livia, who is the friend of his grandmother. He was brought up there with the children of the imperial family, including Claudius, who was the same age as him, as well as Drusus, the young son of Tiberius, to whom he was particularly attached. He thus lived all his youth in the capital of the empire and personally knew almost all the members of the imperial family. Agrippa's future then seemed to be established by his privileged relationship with the heir apparent of Tiberius and, to deceive his hosts, he led the way like his friend who had an unfortunate reputation for prodigality, immorality and excess. He must soon go into debt to ensure this sumptuous life. But this future darkened with the death of Drusus in 23, isolating him and leaving him helpless in the face of his creditors, especially since his mother Berenice probably died at the same time. After the death of his son, Tiberius, upset, reacted by removing his friends from his court.

Agrippa squandered the rest of his fortune trying to win the favor of the freedmen of Tiberius and he hastily left Rome for the province of Judea. The following period saw him experience various adventures and scandals linked to the need to ensure his lifestyle without enjoying the corresponding income.

Return to Judea
He finds himself in a fort in Malatha of Idumea, in the company of his wife Cypros. He probably married around 26 this cousin, daughter of Phasael, son of Tetrarch Phasael, brother of Herod the Great, who gave him a first son named Agrippa. He leads a modest existence far from the splendor of the imperial court and even thinks about suicide. However, his wife got along with Herodias, when she became the wife of Antipas.

Married to an uncle called Herod and known as Philip with whom, according to Flavius Josephus, she has Salome as a child, Herodias has just agreed to leave her first husband "still alive" to marry another of her uncle, Herod Antipas, tetrarch of Galilee. Indeed, Philip the Tetrarch “died childless” (33/34) and Antipas hoped both that the territories of his half-brother would be entrusted to him by Tiberius and that the latter this will give him the title of king. Marriage with Herodias, who descends from the legitimate Hasmonean dynasty, is part of this strategy.

Herodias leads Antipas to help Agrippa: he provides him with money, offers him to settle in Tiberias and entrusts him with the civic magistracy of agoranomos of the city – organizer of the markets of the agora – which provides him with a regular income. However, this situation is short-lived. Agrippa accepts at first, but he soon gives the impression of not being satisfied with what is given to him. He quickly finds this burden boring in a small provincial town devoid of the amenities of the Roman civilization that saw him grow up. He quarrels with his uncle Antipas during a banquet in Tyre and goes to Roman Syria, of which his friend Lucius Pomponius Flaccus is the legate. Shortly after, he was disgraced following an intervention by his own brother Aristobulus Minor, who denounced him to Flaccus for having received a bribe in order to defend the interests of Damascus against Sidon in a border dispute brought before his legate friend. He then decided to attempt a return to Rome where Tiberius, who must have mourned the death of Drusus, might agree to receive his son's old friends again.

Back to Rome

Agrippa borrowed the sum of twenty thousand drachmas to embark at Anthedon for Alexandria, not without having been reminded by the Roman governor of Yavne, Herennius Capiton, for the debts contracted vis-à-vis the treasury of the Empire. The latter sent him the troop but, taking advantage of the night, Agrippa embarked and managed to reach Alexandria where he obtained new funding from the alabarch Alexander Lysimachus, brother of Philo and head of the Jewish community of Alexandria. This senior official, belonging to one of the very rare Jewish families of Roman citizens, was a large landowner and, like Agrippa, a friend of the future Emperor Claudius. Lysimachus refuses to lend the money directly to Agrippa, whose reputation for prodigality is well established, but deals with the latter's wife, whose devotion to her husband he admires. It was with this capital of two hundred thousand drachmas that Agrippa embarked for Italy in the spring of 36.

Tiberius, retired to Capri, received him and gave his son's former companion a warm welcome, a welcome soon tempered by a letter from the governor of Yabne about his debts. But Antonia Minor helps Agrippa to get out of this new embarrassment by advancing him the totality of the sum due — three hundred thousand drachmas — and he regains imperial favour. All these details are found in the second work of Flavius Josephus, the Antiquities of the Jews, published around 93/94, during the reign of Domitian, but in book II of The Jewish War, his first account, published between 75-79, Josephus was more direct. It was “to accuse the tetrarch” Herod Antipas, that Agrippa decided to go “to Tiberius”, in order to try to take his domain and it was because Agrippa had been ousted from his pretensions to obtain the tetrarchy of Antipas that he would have started plotting against the emperor. Like other information, in particular about Agrippa, these are not found in the Judaic Antiquities, where Josephus, however, expands much on the subject.

The emperor asks Agrippa to take charge of Drusus' son, his grandson Tiberius Gemellus, then a teenager and one of the two designated heirs of Tiberius with his grand-nephew Caius Caligula, grandson of the protector of Agrippa, Antonia. The latter undertakes to win the favors and friendship of Caius, imitated in this by another prince without a kingdom, Antiochos of Commagene, and manages to contract a loan of one million drachmas from a Samaritan freedman of the emperor to carry out his project with the rising star of Rome. Although we do not know precisely under what conditions the friendship between the two men was forged, it must have been worth such an investment.

A flattery from Agrippa to Caligula will however cause him trouble: wishing in a conversation that the death of Tiberius would not be delayed any longer so that the young prince could succeed him, this remark is reported to Tiberius who orders the arrest of the dishonest. The latter, a friend of the probable next emperor, enjoyed a comfortable captivity and was released by Caligula shortly after the death of Tiberius on March 16, 37, when Pontius Pilate arrived in Rome.

The accession to the throne of his friend began Agrippa's fortune: the emperor, for his release, offered him a gold chain "of the same weight as the chain of his captivity". He grants him, in addition to the title of king and the diadem which is its sign, the territories of Philip, who died shortly before, tetrarch of Iturea, Trachonitis, Batanea, Gaulanitis, Auranitis and Paneas, located northeast of the lake of Tiberias. Caligula also conferred on him the praetorian ornaments, a dignity which allows certain non-senators to sit among them during public celebrations. “This completely exceptional reversal of the situation seems to have greatly impressed Agrippa's contemporaries”.

According to Flavius Josephus, at the very moment when he placed the royal diadem on the head of Agrippa I, Caligula sent Marullus as "hipparch (ἱππάρχης) of Judea" to replace Pontius Pilate, who had been dismissed by Lucius Vitellius, and had just arrived in Rome. Agrippa therefore shows no eagerness to take charge of the affairs of his kingdom and it is only in the summer of 38 that he goes to Batanea for a short stay, because the networks of influence are woven more in Rome where resides often the real power.

Troubles in Palestine

During his stay in Rome, several events take place in Palestine which create a very tense situation. Since 35, the Romans and the legate of Syria Lucius Vitellius are engaged in a decisive confrontation against the Parthians and their king Artabanus III about the control of the kingdom of Armenia. In 36, the armies of two kings who were clients of the Romans, Aretas IV and Herod Antipas, clashed around the territory of Gamla, causing a crushing defeat for the latter. According to Movses Khorenatsi, as well as several sources in Syriac and Armenian, the king of Edessa, Abgar V "provides auxiliaries" to the Nabataean king, Aretas IV, to wage war against Herod (Antipas) ». However, the historicity of this mention is disputed by Jean-Pierre Mahé. It is possible that Aretas took advantage of Antipas' participation in the great conference on the Euphrates, to conceal peace and the Roman victory over Artabanus III (autumn 36), to launch his offensive. Territorial claim of the Nabataeans was revived by Antipas' will to repudiate Phasaélis, the daughter of the king of Petra Aretas to marry Herodias, the sister of Agrippa I. Antipas' goal is only dynastic. It is a question of consolidating his position to be named by the emperor at the head of the tetrarchy of Philip who has just died or to be named king. At some point in this conflict, probably between 29 and 35, Antipas thinks of silencing his opposition by executing a Jewish preacher called John the Baptist. This execution seems to have had important repercussions on the political situation in the region for several years. Thus the defeat of Antipas is considered within the Jewish population as a divine revenge against Antipas to punish him for having put John to death and of which Aretas IV would have been only the instrument.

According to Simon Claude Mimouni, the governorship of Pontius Pilate is one of the five high points of the troubles that Palestine experienced between the death of Herod the Great and the outbreak of the Great Jewish Revolt, punctuated by no less than six major incidents, to which must be added the execution of Jesus of Nazareth and possibly the sedition of Jesus Bar Abbas, whose popularity is reported in the synoptic gospels. However, for some historians, the two Jesuses are one, the evangelists using a literary device to describe two faces of Jesus, while exempting the Romans from their responsibility in this execution, so that the Gospels cannot be suspected of containing the slightest criticism of the authorities in power.

In 36, Pontius Pilate quickly suppressed a gathering of Samaritans on Mount Gerizim, the most convinced of whom “took up arms”. The gathering had a messianic connotation whose leader—whom Flavius Josephus avoids naming—sought to appear as the eschatological prophet similar to Moses, one of the three messianic figures found in the Dead Sea Scrolls. A figure that has also been attributed to John the Baptist and Jesus the Nazorean. Certain Church fathers, as well as the Mandaean tradition and in particular one of their writings, the Haran-Gawaita, provide indications according to which it could be Dositheos of Samaria who succeeded to the head of the movement of John the Baptist after his execution, for he was one of his thirty disciples. Pilate crucified their leaders and the most prominent personalities that he managed to capture.

At the end of that same year, Vitellius used the complaints of the Council of Samaritans about this last incident as a pretext to dismiss the prefect of Judea Pontius Pilate at the end of a ten-year term, "so that he explains to the emperor what the Jews are accusing him of. » On the following Passover, he came in person to Jerusalem to dismiss the high priest Caiaphas, who was too closely linked to Pilate, and restored to the priests of the temple the supervision of the ceremonies of the great Jewish worship festivals. When the death of Tiberius was announced at Pentecost 37, Vitellius, very reluctant to support Antipas with his troops, interrupted the march of his two legions against Aretas IV, considering that he could no longer wage war without orders from the new emperor. He “makes the people swear loyalty to Caligula” and once again dismisses the high priest whom he had appointed 50 days earlier.

First comer to his kingdom

Agrippa returned to his territories in the summer of 38, after the situation had been clarified on the spot by Lucius Vitellius, probably assisted by Marullus, the new prefect of Judea. Flavius Josephus does not recount the conditions under which the Nabataeans troops withdrew from the former tetrarchy of Philip, which constitutes the bulk of the territories attributed to Agrippa. An agreement finally had to be reached between Aretas and the Romans represented on the spot by the legate of Syria. According to Nikos Kokkinos, Lindner showed that it was Caligula who transferred Damascus to Nabathean control. For him, since Caligula succeeded Tiberius who died on March 16, 37, the negotiations with Aretas could not have been completed before the summer of the same year.

On the way to his new kingdom, Agrippa passed through Alexandria around July 38 where he probably lodged with the alabarch Alexandre Lysimaque, the brother of Philo of Alexandria and the father of Tiberius Alexander. whose daughter Berenice would marry the son Marcus Alexander a few years later. There was then an anti-Jewish atmosphere in the city that had lasted for some time. During festivities, the new king was the target of a popular anti-Jewish masquerade featuring an idiot nicknamed Karabas, foreshadowing the Jewish-Alexandrian conflict that agitated the city from 38 to 41. The Roman governor of Alexandria, Flaccus, seems to let the popular agitation unfold, hostile to Agrippa, whom he is jealous of, protected by an emperor into whose graces Flaccus does not manage to enter, whose confidence he senses is losing and who moreover had him executed shortly after.

These troubles led the two parties—Jews and Alexandrian Greeks—to each send three delegates to the emperor to settle the deeper conflict between the two communities. Philo was one of the Jewish delegation.

The return of Agrippa I crowned with a royal title excites the jealousy of his sister Herodias who urges her husband Antipas to claim for himself the title of king in Rome. In 39, Antipas then resolves to go and meet Caligula to try to obtain this imperial favor, which will precipitate his loss. Informed of this trip, Agrippa I dispatched his most faithful freedman to Rome, bearing a letter for the emperor, followed soon after by Agrippa himself. He accuses Antipas of fomenting a plot with the Parthians and of having accumulated, without telling the Emperor, stocks of arms in his arsenals in Tiberias, probably with the intention of preparing his revenge against King Aretas IV who had defeated him a few years earlier. While the second accusation is probably true, the first is doubtful. However Caligula falls, banishes and exiles Herod Antipas in the south of Gaul where his wife freely accompanies him. As for Agrippa, he receives the territories of Antipas — Galilee and Peraea — as well as all the property confiscated from the tetrarch and his wife.

The statue of Caligula

Representation in the Temple

Following the clashes between Jews and Greeks in Alexandria, for confused reasons the delegation led by Philo of Alexandria to Caligula learned "with horror" of the Emperor's project to erect his own statue in the Temple of Jerusalem in gold under the guise of Zeus. According to Josephus, it is possible that the emperor was sensitive to the arguments of the delegation of Greeks from Alexandria led by Apion who, in the conflict between the two parties, complained of the "privileges" granted to the Jews. For Goodman, Caligula intends to develop the imperial cult and to place himself above the politics of mortals in his lifetime and has the idea of ​​imposing his divine status on the empire, whatever the political consequences.

Caligula's initiative horrifies the Jewish subjects of the Empire and causes unrest in the diaspora in Rome, but also in Alexandria, Thessaloniki, Antioch and in Palestine, particularly in Galilee. Caligula enjoins the new proconsul of Syria, Publius Petronius, to place the statue willingly or by force in the "Holy of Holies" of the Temple of Jerusalem, violating Judaic aniconism in the holiest place of this religion. Petronius disposes necessary armed troops—two Roman legions and auxiliaries—which he barracks at Ptolemais, in Phoenicia, in the event of an uprising and his mission is to accompany the procession of the statue—being made in Sidon — through Judea, as far as Jerusalem. The population rushed in numbers to Ptolemais, supported by the Jewish religious authorities, then to Tiberias where the troubles continued for about forty days. Petronius goes there and meets the notables as well as Aristobulus brother of Agrippa - in the absence of the latter who is in Rome - in the presence and under the pressure of the crowd. Convinced of the imminence of a major revolt, Petronius tempered with the emperor by an exchange of letters exposing – at the risk of his life – the difficulties of the situation: the inhabitants of Galilee were close to the general revolt, as well as the Jews of Judea, the peasants risking setting fire to the crops just before harvesting, while preparing for war. The emperor's first response was fairly moderate, but some sources report a “furious” response from Caligula to Petronius, not considering any compromise.

Agrippa's Intervention

During these events, Agrippa was in Rome and it is possible that he learned of the affair from Caligula himself, which plunged him into a conflict between his two identities, Jewish and Roman. But, after a few days of reflection, he took the side and took the risk of helping his Jewish compatriots in the defense of the Temple threatened with desecration: for Josephus, it was a discussion during a banquet; for Philo, it is a request addressed to the emperor, the content of which he reports, although in terms that reveal a certain exaggeration of the role of Agrippa. Be that as it may, the approach does not lack courage for the adventurer he has been until then and Philo's text reflects the ideas that were to feature in the request, whatever its form: Agrippa notes there with gratitude all the benefits he has been the object on the part of the emperor but explains that he would gladly exchange them for one thing only: "that the ancestral institutions are not disturbed. For what of my reputation among my countrymen and other men? Either I must be considered a traitor to myself or I must cease to be counted among your friends; there is no other choice…”.

At first, Caligula seemed to give in to his friend's pleas and instructed Petronius to suspend his action towards Jerusalem, while warning the Jewish populations not to take any action against the shrines, statues and altars erected in his honor, as a reproduction of Caligula's letter by Flavius Josephus seems to attest. But the emperor seemed to reconsider his decision and it was the murder of Caligula that seemed to put a definitive end to the enterprise and put an end to the desire for a popular uprising. Flavius Josephus still recounts how the emperor, suspecting Petronius of having been bribed to break his orders, ordered him to commit suicide, but this letter arrived after the announcement of Caligula's death, in which Josephus saw an effect of Providence.

This even temporary success of Agrippa testifies to the close relations which bind him with the most important personalities of the Roman world, which will be confirmed during the succession of the assassinated emperor.

Death of Caligula and installation of Claudius

On January 24, 41, Caligula was assassinated by a large-scale conspiracy, notably involving the praetorian commander Cassius Chaerea as well as several senators. The conspirators intended to return to a republic. Yet it was Claudius, Caligula's uncle, who was pushed to imperial power by the anti-republicans under curious conditions at the center of which Agrippa gravitated. Claudius was certainly erudite, but nevertheless excessively shy, afflicted with a physical handicap and without particular ambition. The omnipresent support of his childhood friend, as well as his maneuvers, seem to have been decisive in his assent to power.

If we are to believe Flavius Josephus and the Roman historian  Cassius Dio, Agrippa indeed played a significant role in the choice of the new emperor. It was he who led a squad of the Praetorian Guard to the palace in search of Claudius, who had hidden there for fear of being assassinated. It was also at his instigation that the praetorians proclaimed Claudius emperor because without a sovereign, the guard lost its raison d'être. He then went to the Capitol where the senators met in conclave and acted as intermediaries between them and Claudius. He inspired Claudius with a response to the latter, "in conformity with the dignity of his power" and he persuaded them to wisely abandon their idea of ​​a republic, arguing that a new emperor has been proclaimed by the praetorians - of whom he pointed out that 'they surround the meeting" — and expected nothing but their enthusiastic support. The senators proclaimed Claudius emperor, and Agrippa recommended that Claudius be lenient vis-à-vis the conspirators, except for the regicides Cassius Chaerea and Lupus.

Enlarged Kingdom

If these stories are to be believed, this episode made the new Emperor obligated by his childhood friend and this devotion earned him a sizeable reward: Agrippa saw his possessions increased by most of the ancient kingdom of Herod Archelaus — Judea, Idumea and Samaria — but also the city of Abila in Anti-Lebanon so that the sovereign now reigned over a territory as vast as that of his grandfather Herod the Great.

According to Cassius Dio, Claudius also granted his friend consular rank and authorized him "to appear in the senate and express his gratitude in Greek". Finally, to mark the considerable status of the sovereign, a treaty was ratified with the Senate and the people of Rome on the Forum, which took up the old treaties of friendship and Judeo-Roman alliance. Agrippa is declared there rex amicus et socius Populi Romani - as his grandfather had been in 40 BC. — and the text is preserved on bronze tablets in the temple of Jupiter Capitolinus.

These new charges decide Agrippa to consider that his place is henceforth on his territories and he embarks soon after for Judea. It was the same year that Berenice, daughter of Agrippa, united under the patronage of the emperor to Marcus, the son of the alabarch of Alexandria, Alexander Lysimachus whom Claudius had freed from the captivity to which the reduced Caligula.

Claudius' accession to the throne also marked the restoration of several other kingdoms in Asia Minor. Herod, Agrippa's brother also received a royal title, was granted the principality of Chalcis, previously attached to the kingdom of Iturea and was honored in Rome with the title of praetor. He would marry his niece, Bérénice, after the premature death of her young husband.

Reign of Agrippa I

Judaism in the Empire
An edict by Claudius recalls the privileges granted to Alexandrian Jews who can live according to their laws and whom nothing can rule out from the observance of the Torah, soon followed by a second edict which extends the Alexandrian privileges to the Jews of the diaspora throughout the whole empire.

Agrippa and his brother Herod of Chalcis also play the role of intercessors in favor of the Jews with the emperor. Their skills are not only recognized but also extended to all the Jewish communities of the Empire by the will of Claudius himself. They also have the status of censors of Jewish morals: they ensure respect for the Torah by the communities of the diaspora.

A few months after the murder of Caligula, inhabitants of the Phoenician city of Dôra (south of Mount Carmel) introduced a statue of Claudius into the main synagogue of the city. For all those who stood up against Caligula's plan to erect his statue in the Temple of Herusalem, it is a real provocation. Agrippa intervenes immediately and asks for the application of the decree of Claudius. He acts here as an ethnarch of the Jews, since Dora is not located on his territory. Petronius, the proconsul of Syria immediately ordered the magistrates of Dora to remove the statue, referring to the edict of Claudius. However, this openness must be put into perspective, which is also reflected in the measures to limit worship against the Jews of Rome, as Dion Cassius reports (History, 60, 6, 6-7), perhaps in reaction to the agitation resulting from the rapid development of the movement of the followers of Jesus and which would be evoked by the Letter of Claudius to the Alexandrians. For François Blanchetière, the writing of Philo Legation to Caïus "constitutes an apology for Augustus, to be read a contrario as a criticism of the Judeophobic policy of Claudius (Legation to Caius 155-158). »

Administration of the kingdom

Apart from the recognition he must feel towards him, Claudius probably also saw in the appointment of Agrippa, heir to the Herodians and the Hasmoneans but also attached to the Julio-Claudians by personal relations, a factor of stability which could rid the imperial administration of the management of a province with endemic troubles.

Agrippa clearly inherited his grandfather's splendor and his desire for recognition beyond his borders. Internally, he tried to satisfy both his Jewish and pagan subjects and was divided between his religious capital, Jerusalem, and his “little Rome”, Caesarea. He also undertook the major project of raising the ramparts of his historic capital and extending it to the new northern district thanks to funding from the Temple treasury, which gave some of his Jewish subjects hope for the restoration of an independent kingdom. or at least a rediscovered form of sovereignty.

He continued the policy of euergetism external to Judea of Herod the Great by financing the construction of prestigious works (theatre, amphitheater and baths) in liberalities which mainly benefited the Roman colony of Berytus, without forgetting however the cities of Phoenicia and Syria. He also offered shows and games, notably with gladiators, even if this contravened Jewish prescriptions, which he got accepted by using condemned criminals.

On a religious level, as soon as he arrived, Agrippa forged the reputation of a very pious man whom he knew how to maintain, as attested by the Mishnah, which recounts a finely orchestrated ceremony where the king was acclaimed and obtained the legitimacy of the priests in the Temple of Jerusalem while his grandfather Herod had never been admitted to the third court of the Temple. However, through his grandmother, Mariamne the Hasmonean, Agrippa belonged to a priestly family, which Herod did not. He is thus the first Herodo-Hasmonean to participate in a Temple office since the dismissal of the Hasmonean Antigonus II Mattathias, even if he does not sacrifice himself. 

The Mishnah explained how the Jews of the Second Temple era interpreted the requirement of  that the king read the Torah to the people. At the conclusion of the first day of Sukkot immediately after the conclusion of the seventh year in the cycle, they erected a wooden dais in the Temple court, upon which the king sat. The synagogue attendant took a Torah scroll and handed it to the synagogue president, who handed it to the High Priest's deputy, who handed it to the High Priest, who handed it to the king. The king stood and received it, and then read sitting. King Agrippa stood and received it and read standing, and the sages praised him for doing so. When Agrippa reached the commandment of  that “you may not put a foreigner over you” as king, his eyes ran with tears, but they said to him, “Don’t fear, Agrippa, you are our brother, you are our brother!” The king would read from  up through the shema, and then  the portion regarding tithes, the portion of the king, and the blessings and curses. The king would recite the same blessings as the High Priest, except that the king would substitute a blessing for the festivals instead of one for the forgiveness of sin. (Mishnah Sotah 7:8; Babylonian Talmud Sotah 41a.)

Agrippa used his prerogative to appoint the high priests of the Temple three times during his short reign, choosing alternately from the priestly dynasties of the Anan and the Boethos.

His short administration was thus placed under the domination of Rome, of which he was an instrument of control, and the marks of honor given as sovereign by the Jews to the Temple testify to the "generalized clientelism in which personal friendships administrative relations throughout the Empire. Agrippa's reign, however, did not last long enough to determine its political direction in any meaningful way.

Regional ambitions and unexpected death

Vibius Marsus, the governor of Syria who succeeded Petronius, was much less favorable to him. He sent a series of letters to Claudius to express his fears of Agrippa's rising power, reflecting the jealousy of the prince's Roman compatriots in the region. For his part, Agrippa repeatedly asked the emperor to dismiss the legate.

The legate of Syria interrupted, on the orders of Claudius alerted, the fortification of Jerusalem and tempered the regional diplomatic ambitions of the latter. Indeed, Agrippa invited to Tiberias the kings Herod of Chalcis — his brother —, the king of Emesa Sampsigeramos — father-in-law of his brother Aristobulus — as well as three princes who had been his companions in Rome, Antiochos of Commagene, Cotys of Lesser Armenia and Polemon, king of Pontus. Marsus argued the possibility of a conspiracy. Although it is unlikely that Agrippa considered breaking with his close Roman protectors and familiars, the kings were enjoined to return to their respective kingdoms without delay.

Agrippa died unexpectedly in the year 44, after only three years of reign over Judea, during the Games of Caesarea in honor of the emperor. Patronizing the games, he appeared there in dazzling silver finery in front of the crowd who acclaimed him and compared him to a god, a blasphemous remark for a Jew against which the king did not protest. Some of his contemporaries read as a divine punishment for this blasphemy the cause of his death which occurred shortly after: two days later, he was seized with violent abdominal pains and died after five days of agony, at the age of fifty-three years. The precise causes of his death are unknown, but from that time on rumors of poisoning circulated. According to the Acts of the Apostles which appears in the New Testament, it would be an angel, come at the time of the declarations of the people who therefore compared him to a God, who would have struck him, then had him devoured by worms (Acts 12:20-23). Several researchers believe that the poisoning by the Romans worried about his excessive political ambitions is likely, even that it is a personal initiative of Marsus to attenuate the hostility of the neighboring Syrian populations.

The reign of Aggripa I thus did not last long enough to be able to significantly outline its political orientation. Nevertheless, the hopes of regained sovereignty aroused among the Jews of Palestine by his accession did not disappear with his death and were probably part of the causes that led to the Jewish revolt which broke out some twenty years later in the ancient kingdom.

Succession

The death of Agrippa is the pretext for the pagan populations of the kingdom to celebrations and rejoicings, in particular in Caesarea and Sebaste, which the sovereign had nevertheless largely favored. The hostility of the Syrian populations is also evident and the statues of the three king's daughters adorning the palace of Caesarea are outraged by Syrian auxiliaries.

Rather than entrusting the late king's kingdom to his son Agrippa II — an inexperienced young man who grew up at the imperial court, protected by the emperor — Claudius made it a Roman province but procuratorian which henceforth came under the jurisdiction of the governor of Syria, but aware of Marsus' unpopularity with the Jews, the emperor reinstated a Roman official, Cuspius Fadus, to rule the ancient kingdom of Agrippa Ier, with the title of procurator. But these choices, as well as the lack of reaction vis-à-vis the infamous conduct of the Syrian auxiliaries, generated renewed unrest in Caesarea and elsewhere. The appointment of the priests and the control of the Temple of Jerusalem belong to Herod of Chalcis. It was also the latter who became the privileged intermediary between the Jews and the Romans until his own death in 48.

For the Jews, this disappearance marked the end of hopes for Jewish independence, even symbolic, and it was then that intransigent factious movements with messianic and anti-Roman connotations appeared.

Posterity
Half a century after Agrippa's sudden death, Flavius Josephus evokes the sovereign in these terms: “Agrippa's character was gentle and his benevolence was equal for all. He was full of humanity for people of foreign races and also showed them his liberality, but he was also helpful for his compatriots and showed them even more sympathy”. Josephus gave Agrippa a positive legacy and related that he was known in his time as "Agrippa the Great". In the rabbinical sources, Agrippa is presented as a pious man and his reign is described in a very positive way. Conversely, the pagan inhabitants of Caesarea and Sebaste organized rejoicings at his death.

A significant number of critics follow the Christian tradition to identify Agrippa with "Herod the king" who, in the Acts of the Apostles, persecutes the community of Jesus' disciples in Jerusalem, then who has James the Great killed "with the sword" while that the apostle Peter, later arrested, owes his salvation only to the help of “an angel” who comes by night to help him escape from his prison. However, the Acts of the Apostles, also composed in the 80s and 90s from several sources, "have been the subject of devastating criticism for several decades, to the point of being denied by some, in whole or in part, any historical value” due to the “editorial activity” of its three successive authors. Thus, the entire Petrine document (hypothetical document) to which these episodes would have belonged seems to have been placed at the beginning of Acts by its first writer, following this account by the "Gesture of Paul" and it is the next writer - perhaps being the Luke the Evangelist — which would have been inserted between the two "Gestures" of Peter and Paul, the account of the death of Agrippa which gives the impression that all that precedes is dated before 44 and all that follows is later, adding a coming of Paul to Jerusalem which does not appear anywhere in Paul's accounts in his epistles. It is therefore possible that "Herod the king" does not designate Agrippa I, but his son Agrippa II. Indeed, in addition to these editorial elements, the chronological inconsistencies of the Acts have been well known for more than a century, in particular the speech of Gamaliel, delivered seven chapters before the account of the death of Agrippa to defend the apostles during a previous arrest, speaks of the death of Theudas intervened under the procurator Cuspius Fadus (44-46) and in the Gesture of Peter which constitutes the first part of the Acts, the murder of Jame the Great, then the arrest-escape of Peter are later of five chapters to this speech  and precedes the account of the death of Agrippa (44).

This account of the death of Agrippa, probably inserted by the second redactor of the Acts of the Apostles diverges from that of Flavius Josephus, but otherwise agrees with him on the divine origin of his mortal illness, occasioned by his impious refusal to reject the deification of which he is the object by the people, perhaps testifying to the use of a common Jewish source.

Progeny
From his union with Cypros, Agrippa has four children reaching adulthood, a son Agrippa, and three daughters, Berenice, Mariamne and Drusilla. Another son, Drusus, died in infancy

Agrippa, born in 27/28, was raised at the court of Rome under the protection of Claudius but was not chosen by the latter to succeed his father, "which provoked renewed political agitation in the years that followed". It was not until 49 that the emperor granted him the tetrarchy of Chalcis together with the royal dignity one year after the death of his uncle Herod. Like his father, he also received the administration of the Temple of Jerusalem and the power to designate the high priests previously held by Herod of Chalcis, with the title of epimelete (administrator)113. In 53/54, he returned this territory in exchange for most of the ex-tetrarchy of Philip, to which were added the tetrarchies of Lysanias and Varus. Later (in 54-56 or 61), he receives from Nero territories in Galilee on the western shore of Lake Tiberias, as well as in Perea and around Abila and Livias. He was a prince close to the Romans, on whose side he sided during the Great Jewish Revolt of the years 66-70, he subsequently obtained various territories which concerned the history of Syria more than that of Palestine. Its territories are attached to the Roman province of Syria in 92/94. A large part of the critics believe that he died at this time, but other critics are based on the indication of Photios of Constantinople who in the ninth century placed this death in the third year of Trajan (100). He has no children or close heirs.

The unions of Agrippa's daughters are part of a matrimonial strategy consisting in allying with the most fortunate party possible which is not exempt from competition between the sisters. The first of the daughters, Berenice [b. AD 28-after 81] married Marcus Julius Alexander, son of Alexander the Alabarch  of Alexandria, nephew of the philosopher Philo of Alexandria and brother of Tiberius Alexander, who was appointed procurator of Judea in 46 by Claudius. This first husband died shortly afterwards and Berenice was then united to her paternal uncle Herod of Chalcis, with whom she had two sons, Berenician and Hyrcan.<ref >Josephus, 'Antiquities of the Jews XX.5.2</ref> After the death of Herod of Chalcis and the insistent rumors of incest with her brother Agrippa, she proposes to Marcus Antonius Polemo, client king of Cilicia (south of Cappadocia), to marry her. Polemon accepts because Berenice has the status of queen and especially according to Flavius Josephus, because she is very rich. On both sides, it is only an alliance to increase their power. Polemon however made a major concession, he converted to Judaism and had himself circumcised. But very quickly, she abandons him to return with her brother, “out of levity, they say” specifies Flavius Josephus. She finally becomes the famous mistress of Titus who dismisses her before he reaches the imperial office.

The second daughter, Mariamne [b. 34/35-], married Julius Archelaus son of an officer of the court of Agrippa named Chelkias They had a daughter Berenice (daughter of Mariamne) who lived with her mother in Alexandria, Egypt after her parents' divorce. Mariamne left her husband and married Demetrius of Alexandria, "the first of the Jews of Alexandria by birth and fortune who was then Alabarch” from the city.,and had a son from him named Agrippinus.

The last, Drusilla, born around 38, was first promised to Gaius Epiphanes, son of Antiochus IV of Commagene, but the prince refused to be circumcised for the occasion. Drusilla is then united with Gaius Julius Azizus, King of Emesa, another oriental prince, whom she leaves to marry the procurator of Judaea Antonius Felix, around 50 who, according to Flavius Josephus, would have taken her away from her husband. The couple had a son called Agrippa (probably Marcus Antonius Agrippa) died in Pompeii or Herculaneum with his wife during the eruption of Mount Vesuvius en 79.

Family tree

Agrippa in other media
 Herod Agrippa is the protagonist of the Italian opera L’Agrippa tetrarca di Gerusalemme (1724) by Giuseppe Maria Buini (mus.) and Claudio Nicola Stampa (libr.), first performed at the Teatro Ducale of Milan, Italy, on August 28, 1724.
 Herod Agrippa is a major figure in Robert Graves' novel Claudius the God, as well as the BBC television adaptation I, Claudius, wherein he was portrayed by James Faulkner as an adult and Michael Clements as a child. He is depicted as one of Claudius's closest lifelong friends. Herod acts as Claudius's last and most trustworthy friend and advisor, giving him the key advice to trust no one, not even him. This advice proves prophetic at the end of Herod's life, where he is depicted as coming to believe that he is a prophesied Messiah and raising a rebellion against Rome, to Claudius's dismay. However, he is struck down by a possibly supernatural illness and sends a final letter to Claudius asking for forgiveness.

See also
Herodian dynasty
Herodian kingdom
List of biblical figures identified in extra-biblical sources
List of Hasmonean and Herodian rulers

Notes and references

 Explanatory notes 

 Citations 

 General sources 
Ancient springs
 Flavius Josephus, The Jewish War, Livre II, XI
 Flavius Josephus, Antiquities of the Jews, livre XIX
 Cassius Dio, Histoire romaine, livres LIX et LX
 Philo, Ad Flaccum Acts of the Apostles, 12

Historians
 . 
 . 
 . 
 . 
 . 
 Nikkos Kokkinos, The Herodian Dynasty: Origins, Role in Society and Eclipse'', Sheffield Academic Press, Sheffield, coll. « Journal for the Study of the Pseudepigrapha Supplement Series », 1998 . 
 . 
 . 
 . 
 . 
 . 
 . 
 . 
 .

External links

 
 Agrippa I, article in historical sourcebook by Mahlon H. Smith
 Sergey E. Rysev. Herod and Agrippa

|-

|-

People in Acts of the Apostles
Herodian dynasty
Herod Agrippa, Marcus
Jewish royalty
11 BC births
44 deaths
Roman client rulers
1st-century monarchs in the Middle East
1st-century Roman governors of Judaea
1st-century Herodian rulers
Judean people
Judea (Roman province)
Deaths onstage
1st-century Jews